Ecuador sent a delegation to compete at the 2008 Summer Paralympics in Beijing, People's Republic of China. The delegation consisted of two competitors, both powerlifters.

Powerlifting 

Key: NMR=No marks recorded

See also
Ecuador at the Paralympics
Ecuador at the 2008 Summer Olympics

External links
 

Nations at the 2008 Summer Paralympics
2008
Summer Paralympics